Gregori's labeo (Labeo gregorii) is fish in genus Labeo. It is found in the Tana and Galana Rivers in Kenya and Tanzania. IUCN reports it also from Juba, Somalia, and does not include Tanzania in the distribution area.

References 

Gregori's labeo
Cyprinid fish of Africa
Fauna of Somalia
Freshwater fish of Tanzania
Freshwater fish of Kenya
Gregori's labeo